Aconitum, also known as aconite, monkshood, wolf's-bane, leopard's bane, mousebane, women's bane, devil's helmet, queen of poisons, or blue rocket, is a genus of over 250 species of flowering plants belonging to the family Ranunculaceae. These herbaceous perennial plants are chiefly native to the mountainous parts of the Northern Hemisphere in North America, Europe, and Asia; growing in the moisture-retentive but well-draining soils of mountain meadows.

Most Aconitum species are extremely poisonous and must be handled very carefully.  Several Aconitum hybrids, such as the Arendsii form of Aconitum carmichaelii, have won gardening awards—such as the Royal Horticultural Society's Award of Garden Merit. Some are used by florists.

Etymology

The name aconitum comes from the Greek word , which may derive from the Greek akon for dart or javelin, the tips of which were poisoned with the substance, or from akonae, because of the rocky ground on which the plant was thought to grow. The Greek name lycoctonum, which translates literally to "wolf's bane", is thought to indicate the use of its juice to poison arrows or baits used to kill wolves. The English name monkshood refers to the cylindrical helmet, called the galea, distinguishing the flower.

Description
The dark green leaves of Aconitum species lack stipules. They are palmate or deeply palmately lobed with five to seven segments. Each segment again is trilobed with coarse sharp teeth. The leaves have a spiral (alternate) arrangement. The lower leaves have long petioles.

The tall, erect stem is crowned by racemes of large blue, purple, white, yellow, or pink zygomorphic flowers with numerous stamens. They are distinguishable by having one of the five petaloid sepals (the posterior one), called the galea, in the form of a cylindrical helmet, hence the English name monkshood. Two to 10 petals are present. The two upper petals are large and are placed under the hood of the calyx and are supported on long stalks. They have a hollow spur at their apex, containing the nectar. The other petals are small and scale-like or nonforming. The three to five carpels are partially fused at the base.

The fruit is an aggregate of follicles, a follicle being a dry, many-seeded structure.

Unlike with many species from genera (and their hybrids) in Ranunculaceae (and the related Papaveroideae subfamily), there are no double-flowered forms.

Color range
A medium to dark semi-saturated blue-purple is the typical flower color for Aconitum species. Aconitum species tend to be variable enough in form and color in the wild to cause debate and confusion among experts when it comes to species classification boundaries. The overall color range of the genus is rather limited, although the palette has been extended a small amount with hybridization. In the wild, some Aconitum blue-purple shades can be very dark. In cultivation the shades do not reach this level of depth.

Aside from blue-purple—white, very pale greenish-white, creamy white, and pale greenish-yellow are also somewhat common in nature. Wine red (or red-purple) occurs in a hybrid of the climber Aconitum hemsleyanum. There is a pale semi-saturated pink produced by cultivation as well as bicolor hybrids (e.g. white centers with blue-purple edges). Purplish shades range from very dark blue-purple to a very pale lavender that is quite greyish. The latter occurs in the "Stainless Steel" hybrid.

Neutral blue (rather than purplish or greenish), greenish-blue, and intense blues, available in some related Delphinium plants—particularly Delphinium grandiflorum—do not occur in this genus. Aconitum plants that have purplish-blue flowers are often inaccurately referred to as having blue flowers, even though the purple tone dominates. If there are species with true (neutral) blue or greenish-blue flowers they are rare and do not occur in cultivation. Also unlike the genus Delphinium, there are no bright red nor intense pink Aconitum flowers, as none known are pollinated by hummingbirds. There are no orange-flowered varieties nor any that are green. Aconitum is typically more intense in color than Helleborus but less intense than Delphinium. There are no blackish flowers in Aconitum, unlike with Helleborus.

Monkshood (Aconitum napellus) produces light indigo-blue flowers,  while Wolf's Bane (Aconitum vulparia) produces whitish or straw-yellow flowers.

Horticultural trade morphology
The lack of double-flowered forms in the horticultural trade stands in contrast with the other genera of Ranunculaceae used regularly in gardens. This includes one major genus that is known solely by most gardeners for a double-flowered form of one species—Ranunculus asiaticus, known colloquially in the trade as "Ranunculus". The Ranunculus genus contains approximately 500 species. One other species of Ranunculus has seen minor use in gardens, the 'Flore Pleno' (doubled) form of Ranunculus acris. Doubled forms of Consolida and Delphinium dominate the horticultural trade while single forms of Anemone, Aquilegia, Clematis, Helleborus, Pulsatilla—and the related Papaver—retain some popularity. No doubled forms of Aconitum are known.

Ecology
Aconitum species have been recorded as food plant of the caterpillars of several moths. The yellow tiger moth Arctia flavia, and the purple-shaded gem Euchalcia variabilis are at home on A. vulparia. The engrailed Ectropis crepuscularia, yellow-tail Euproctis similis, mouse moth Amphipyra tragopoginis, pease blossom Periphanes delphinii, and Mniotype bathensis, have been observed feeding on A. napellus. The purple-lined sallow Pyrrhia exprimens, and Blepharita amica were found eating from A. septentrionale. The dot moth Melanchra persicariae occurs both on A. septentrionale and A. intermedium. The golden plusia Polychrysia moneta is hosted by A. vulparia, A. napellus, A. septentrionale, and A. intermedium. Other moths associated with Aconitum species include the wormwood pug Eupithecia absinthiata, satyr pug E. satyrata, Aterpia charpentierana, and A. corticana. It is also the primary food source for the Old World bumblebees Bombus consobrinus and Bombus gerstaeckeri.

Aconitum flowers are pollinated by long-tongued bumblebees. Bumblebees have the strength to open the flowers and reach the single nectary at the top of the flower on its inside. Some short-tongued bees will bore holes into the tops of the flowers to steal nectar. However, alkaloids in the nectar function as a deterrent for species unsuited to pollination. The effect is greater in certain species, such as Aconitum napellus, than in others, such as Aconitum lycoctonum. Unlike the species with blue-purple flowers such as A. napellus, A. lycoctonum—which has off-white to pale yellow flowers, has been found to be a nectar source for butterflies. This is likely due to the nectary flowers of the latter being more easily reachable by the butterflies; however, the differing alkaloid character of the two plants may also play a significant role or be the primary influence.

Cultivation

The species typically utilized by gardeners fare well in well-drained evenly moist "humus-rich" garden soils like many in the related Helleborus and Delphinium genera, and can grow in the partial shade. Species not used in gardens tend to require more exacting conditions (e.g. Aconitum noveboracense). Most Aconitum species prefer to have their roots cool and moist, with the majority of the leaves exposed to sun, like the related Clematis. Aconitum species can be propagated by divisions of the root or by seeds, with care taken to avoid leaving pieces of the root where livestock might be poisoned. All parts of these plants should be handled while wearing protective disposable gloves. Aconitum plants are typically much longer-lived than the closely related delphinium plants, putting less energy into floral reproduction. As a result, they are not described as being "heavy feeders" (needing a higher quantity of fertilizer versus most other flowering plants)—unlike gardeners' delphiniums. As with most in the Ranunculaceae and Papaveraceae families, they dislike root disturbance. As with most in Ranunculaceae, seeds that are not planted soon after harvesting should be stored moist-packed in vermiculite to avoid dormancy and viability issues. The German seed company Jelitto offers "Gold Nugget" seeds that are advertised as utilizing a coating that enables the seed to germinate immediately, bypassing the double dormancy defect (from a typical gardener's point of view) Aconitum—and many other species in Ranunculaceae genera—use as a reproductive strategy. By contrast, seeds that are not immediately planted or moist-packed are described as perhaps taking as long as two years to germinate, being prone to very erratic germination (in terms of time required per seed), and comparatively quick seed viability loss (e.g. Adonis). These issues are typical for many species in Ranunculaceae, such as Pulsatilla (pasqueflower).

Award-winning hybrids
In the UK, the following have gained the Royal Horticultural Society's Award of Garden Merit:

 A. × cammarum 'Bicolor'
 A. carmichaelii 'Arendsii'
 A. carmichaelii 'Kelmscott' 
 A. 'Bressingham Spire'
 A. 'Spark's Variety'
 A. 'Stainless Steel'

Toxicology

Monkshood and other members of the genus Aconitum contain substantial amounts of the highly toxic aconitine and related alkaloids, especially in their roots and tubers. Aconitine is a potent neurotoxin and cardiotoxin that causes persistent depolarization of neuronal sodium channels in tetrodotoxin-sensitive tissues. The influx of sodium through these channels and the delay in their repolarization increases their excitability and may lead to diarrhea, convulsions, ventricular arrhythmia and death.

Marked symptoms may appear almost immediately, usually not later than one hour, and "with large doses death is almost instantaneous". Death usually occurs within two to six hours in fatal poisoning (20 to 40 mL of tincture may prove fatal). The initial signs are gastrointestinal, including nausea, vomiting, and diarrhea. This is followed by a sensation of burning, tingling, and numbness in the mouth and face, and of burning in the abdomen. In severe poisonings, pronounced motor weakness occurs and cutaneous sensations of tingling and numbness spread to the limbs. Cardiovascular features include hypotension, sinus bradycardia, and ventricular arrhythmias. Other features may include sweating, dizziness, difficulty in breathing, headache, and confusion. The main causes of death are ventricular arrhythmias and asystole, or paralysis of the heart or respiratory center. The only post mortem signs are those of asphyxia.

Treatment of poisoning is mainly supportive. All patients require close monitoring of blood pressure and cardiac rhythm. Gastrointestinal decontamination with activated charcoal can be used if given within one hour of ingestion. The major physiological antidote is atropine, which is used to treat bradycardia. Other drugs used for ventricular arrhythmia include lidocaine, amiodarone, bretylium, flecainide, procainamide, and mexiletine. Cardiopulmonary bypass is used if symptoms are refractory to treatment with these drugs. Successful use of charcoal hemoperfusion has been claimed in patients with severe aconitine poisoning.

Mild toxicity (headache, nausea and palpitations) as well as severe toxicity may be experienced from skin contact. Paraesthesia, including tingling and feelings of coldness in the face and extremities, is common in reports of toxicity.

Uses

Medicinal

Aconite has long been used in Ayurveda and traditional Chinese medicine. Aconite was also described in Greek and Roman medicine by Theophrastus, Dioscorides, and Pliny the Elder, who most likely prescribed the Alpine species Aconitum lycoctonum. Folk medicinal use of Aconitum species is still practiced in some parts of Slovenia.

Aconitum chasmanthum is listed as critically endangered, Aconitum heterophyllum as endangered, and Aconitum violaceum as vulnerable due to overcollection for Ayurvedic use.

As a poison
The roots of A. ferox supply the Nepalese poison called bikh, bish, or nabee. It contains large quantities of the alkaloid pseudaconitine, which is a deadly poison. The root of A. luridum, of the Himalaya, is said to be as poisonous as that of A. ferox or A. napellus.

Several species of Aconitum have been used as arrow poisons. The Minaro in Ladakh use A. napellus on their arrows to hunt ibex, while the Ainu in Japan used a species of Aconitum to hunt bear as did the Matagi hunters of the same region before their adoption of firearms. The Chinese also used Aconitum poisons both for hunting and for warfare. Aconitum poisons were used by the Aleuts of Alaska's Aleutian Islands for hunting whales. Usually, one man in a kayak armed with a poison-tipped lance would hunt the whale, paralyzing
it with the poison and causing it to drown. Aconitum tipped arrows are also described in the Rig Veda.

It has, albeit rarely, been hypothesized that Socrates was executed via an extract from an Aconitum species, such as Aconitum napellus, rather than via hemlock, Conium maculatum. Aconitum was commonly used by the ancient Greeks as an arrow poison but can be used for other forms of poisoning. It has been hypothesized that Alexander the Great and Ptolemy XIV Philopator were murdered via aconite.

In 1524, in the first recorded human trial of poison since the ancient Greeks, Pope Clement VII is said to have intentionally poisoned prisoners with aconite laced marzipan to test the effects of an antidote. The treated prisoner survived, while the untreated prisoner suffered a painful death. 

In April 2021, the president of Kyrgyzstan, Sadyr Japarov, promoted aconite root as a treatment for COVID-19. Subsequently, at least four people were admitted to hospital suffering from poisoning. Facebook had previously removed the President's posts advocating use of the substance, saying "We've removed this post as we do not allow anyone, including elected officials, to share misinformation that could lead to imminent physical harm or spread false claims about how to cure or prevent COVID-19".

Taxonomy

Genetic analysis suggests that Aconitum as it was delineated before the 21st century is nested within Delphinium sensu lato, that also includes Aconitella, Consolida, Delphinium staphisagria, D. requini, and D. pictum. Further genetic analysis has shown that the only species of the subgenus "Aconitum (Gymnaconitum), "A. gymnandrum, is sister to the group that consists of Delphinium (Delphinium), Delphinium (Delphinastrum), and "Consolida plus "Aconitella. To make Aconitum monophyletic, "A. gymnandrum has now been reassigned to a new genus, Gymnaconitum. To make Delphinium monophyletic, the new genus Staphisagria was erected containing S. staphisagria, S. requini, and S. pictum.

Species

 Aconitum ajanense
 Aconitum albo-violaceum
 Aconitum altaicum
 Aconitum ambiguum
 Aconitum angusticassidatum
 Aconitum anthora (yellow monkshood)
 Aconitum anthoroideum
 Aconitum album
 Aconitum axilliflorum
 Aconitum baburinii
 Aconitum baicalense
 Aconitum barbatum
 Aconitum besserianum
 Aconitum biflorum
 Aconitum bucovinense
 Aconitum burnatii
 Aconitum carmichaelii (Carmichael's monkshood)
 Aconitum charkeviczii
 Aconitum chasmanthum
 Aconitum chinense Siebold.&Zucc. aka Aconitum carmichaelii var. truppelianum
 Aconitum cochleare
 Aconitum columbianum (western monkshood)
 Aconitum confertiflorum
 Aconitum consanguineum
 Aconitum coreanum
 Aconitum crassifolium
 Aconitum cymbulatum
 Aconitum czekanovskyi
 Aconitum decipiens
 Aconitum degenii (syn. A. variegatum ssp. paniculatum)
 Aconitum delphinifolium (larkspurleaf monkshood)
 Aconitum desoulavyi
 Aconitum ferox (Indian aconite)
 Aconitum firmum
 Aconitum fischeri (Fischer monkshood)
 Aconitum flavum (Fluff iron hammer)
 Aconitum flerovii
 Aconitum gigas
 Aconitum gracile (synonym of A. variegatum ssp. variegatum)
 Aconitum helenae
 Aconitum hemsleyanum (climbing monkshood)
 Aconitum henryi (Sparks variety monkshood)
 Aconitum heterophyllum
 Aconitum hosteanum
 Aconitum infectum (Arizona monkshood)
 Aconitum jacquinii (synonym of A. anthora)
 Aconitum jaluense
 Aconitum japonicum
 Aconitum jenisseense
 Aconitum karafutense
 Aconitum karakolicum
 Aconitum kirinense
 Aconitum koreanum
 Aconitum krylovii
 Aconitum kunasilense
 Aconitum kurilense
 Aconitum kusnezoffii (Kusnezoff monkshood)
 Aconitum kuzenevae
Aconitum lamarckii
 Aconitum lasiostomum
 Aconitum lethale (formerly A. balfourii)
 Aconitum leucostomum
 Aconitum longiracemosum
 Aconitum lycoctonum (northern wolfsbane)
 Aconitum macrorhynchum
 Aconitum maximum (Kamchatka aconite)
 Aconitum miyabei
 Aconitum moldavicum
 Aconitum montibaicalense
 Aconitum nanum
 Aconitum napellus (monkshood; type species)
 Aconitum nasutum
 Aconitum nemorum
 Aconitum neosachalinense
 Aconitum noveboracense (northern blue monkshood)
 Aconitum ochotense
 Aconitum orientale
 Aconitum paniculatum
 Aconitum paradoxum
 Aconitum pascoi
 Aconitum pavlovae
 Aconitum pilipes
 Aconitum plicatum
 Aconitum podolicum
 Aconitum productum
 Aconitum pseudokusnezowii
 Aconitum puchonroenicum
 Aconitum raddeanum
 Aconitum ranunculoides
 Aconitum reclinatum (trailing white monkshood)
 Aconitum rogoviczii
 Aconitum romanicum
 Aconitum rotundifolium
 Aconitum rubicundum
 Aconitum sachalinense
 Aconitum sajanense
 Aconitum saxatile
 Aconitum sczukinii
 Aconitum septentrionale
 Aconitum seravschanicum
 Aconitum sichotense
 Aconitum smirnovii
 Aconitum soongaricum
 Aconitum stoloniferum
 Aconitum stubendorffii
 Aconitum subalpinum
 Aconitum subglandulosum
 Aconitum subvillosum
 Aconitum sukaczevii
 Aconitum taigicola
 Aconitum talassicum
 Aconitum tanguticum
 Aconitum tauricum
 Aconitum turczaninowii
 Aconitum umbrosum
 Aconitum uncinatum (southern blue monkshood)
 Aconitum variegatum
 Aconitum violaceum
 Aconitum volubile
 Aconitum vulparia (wolf's bane)
 Aconitum woroschilovii

Natural hybrids
 Aconitum × austriacum
 Aconitum × cammarum
 Aconitum × hebegynum
 Aconitum × oenipontanum (A. variegatum ssp. variegatum × ssp. paniculatum)
 Aconitum × pilosiusculum
 Aconitum × platanifolium (A. lycoctonum ssp. neapolitanum × ssp. vulparia)
 Aconitum × zahlbruckneri (A. napellus ssp. vulgare × A. variegatum ssp. variegatum)

As a poison
Aconite has been understood as a poison from ancient times, and is frequently represented as such in fiction. In Greek mythology, the goddess Hecate is said to have invented aconite, which Athena used to transform Arachne into a spider. Also, Medea attempted to poison Theseus with a cup of wine poisoned with wolf's bane. The kyōgen (traditional Japanese comedy) play , which is well-known and frequently taught in Japan, is centered on dried aconite root used for traditional Chinese medicine. Taken from Shasekishu, a 13th-century anthology collected by Mujū, the story describes servants who decide that the dried aconite root is really sugar, and suffer unpleasant though nonlethal symptoms after eating it. Shakespeare, in Henry IV Part II Act 4 Scene 4, refers to aconite, alongside rash gunpowder, working as strongly as the "venom of suggestion" to break up close relationships. In BBC drama Shakespeare and Hatherway, series 2, episode 9, a tennis player is poisoned through the skin of his palm by aconite smeared on the handle of his racquet.

As a well-known poison from ancient times, aconite is well-suited for historical fiction. It is the poison used by a murderer in the third of the Cadfael Chronicles, Monk's Hood by Ellis Peters, published in 1980 and set in 1138 in Shrewsbury. In I, Claudius, Livia, wife of Augustus, was portrayed discussing the merits, antidotes, and use of aconite with a poisoner. It also makes a showing in alternate history novels and historical fantasy, such as S. M. Stirling's, On the Oceans of Eternity, where a renegade warlord is poisoned with aconite-laced food by his own chief of internal security, and in the television show Merlin, the lead character, Merlin, attempts to poison Arthur with aconite while under a spell. In the 2003 Korean television series Dae Jang Geum, set in the 15th and 16th centuries, Choi put wolf's bane in the previous queen's food.

Aconite also lends itself to use as a fictional poison in modern settings. An overdose of aconite was the method by which Rudolph Bloom, father of Leopold Bloom in James Joyce's Ulysses, committed suicide.

Wolf's bane
In his mythological poem Metamorphoses, Ovid tells how the herb comes from the slavering mouth of Cerberus, the three-headed dog that guarded the gates of Hades. As the veterinary historian John Blaisdell has noted, symptoms of aconite poisoning in humans bear some passing similarity to those of rabies: frothy saliva, impaired vision, vertigo, and finally a coma. Thus, some ancient Greeks possibly would have believed that this poison, mythically born of Cerberus's lips, was literally the same as that to be found inside the mouth of a rabid dog.

In John Keats's poem Ode to Melancholy, wolf's bane is mentioned in the first verse as the source of "poisonous wine", possibly referring to Medea.

In the 1931 classic horror film Dracula starring Bela Lugosi as Count Dracula and Helen Chandler as Mina Seward, reference is made to wolf's bane (aconitum). Towards the end of the film, "Van Helsing holds up a sprig of wolf's bane". Van Helsing educates the nurse protecting Mina from Count Dracula to place sprigs of wolf's bane around Mina's neck for protection. Furthermore, he instructs that wolf's bane is a plant that grows in central Europe. There, the natives use it to protect themselves against vampires. As long as the wolf's bane is present in Mina's bedroom, she will be safe from Count Dracula. During the night, Count Dracula desires to visit Mina. He appears outside her window in the form of a flying bat. He causes the nurse to become drowsy, and when she awakes from his spell, she removes the sprigs of wolf's bane, placing it in a hallway chest of drawers. With the removal of the wolf's bane from Mina's room, Count Dracula mysteriously appears and transports Mina to the dungeon of the castle.

In the 1941 film The Wolf Man starring Lon Chaney Jr. and Claude Rains, the following poem is recited several times Even a man who is pure in heart and says his prayers by night, may become a wolf when the wolf-bane blooms and the autumn moon is bright.

In the 1943 French novel Our Lady of the Flowers, the boy Culafroy eats "Napel aconite", so that the "Renaissance would take possession of the child through the mouth."

In the TV-show Game of Thrones, one of Tywin Lannister's commanders is assassinated by a dart, identified by Tywin as Wolf's Bane, due to its scent.

In the early 1980s, famed Spanish horror film star Paul Naschy named his production company "Aconito Films", an in-joke relating to the large number of werewolf movies he produced.

In mysticism
Wolf's bane is used as an analogy for the power of divine communion in Liber 65 1:13–16, one of Aleister Crowley's Holy Books of Thelema. Wolf's bane is mentioned in one verse of Lady Gwen Thompson's 1974 poem "Rede of the Wiccae", a long version of the Wiccan Rede: "Widdershins go when Moon doth wane, And the werewolves howl by the dread wolfsbane."

Gallery

See also
 Rufus T. Bush, industrial tycoon who died of accidental aconite poisoning

References

External links

 James Grout: Aconite Poisoning, part of the Encyclopædia Romana
 Photographs of Aconite plants
 Jepson Eflora entry for Aconitum

 
Delphinieae
Neurotoxins
Plant toxins
Ranunculaceae genera
Werewolves
Poisonous plants